Maharaja Ranjit Singh of Punjab (1780–1839) was the founder of the Sikh Empire.

Ranjit Singh may also refer to:

 Ranjit Singh of Bharatpur (1745–1805), Jat ruler of the Bharatpur princely state in Rajasthan, India
 Ranjit Singh (cricketer) or Ranjitsinhji (1872–1933), ruler of the Indian princely state of Nawanagar from 1907 to 1933 and cricketer
 Ranjit Singh (cricketer, born 1994), Indian cricketer
 Ranjit Singh (athlete) (born 1957), Indian Olympic athlete
 Ranjit Singh (volleyball), Indian volleyball player
 Ranjit Singh (How I Met Your Mother character)
 Ranj Singh, British doctor and TV presenter

People with the given names
 Ranjit Singh Dyal (1928–2012), Indian Army officer and administrator
 Ranjit Singh Boparan (born 1966), British businessman

See also
 K. S. Ranjitsinhji (1872–1933), cricketer and  Maharaja Jam Sahib of Nawanagar